Sidsel Owren is a Norwegian ski-orienteering competitor. 

She won a bronze medal in the relay event at the 1982 World Ski Orienteering Championships in Austria, together with Toril Hallan and Ranveig Narbuvold, and placed eleventh in the individual event.

References

Year of birth missing (living people)
Living people
Norwegian orienteers
Female orienteers
Ski-orienteers
20th-century Norwegian women